Henry Barrett Tillman (born 1948) is an American author who specializes in naval and aviation topics in addition to fiction and technical writing.

Tillman's most influential book to date is On Yankee Station (1987), written with John B. Nichols. It is a critical appraisal of naval aviation in the Vietnam War.  According to Tillman, it was added to the US Air Force and Marine Corps professional reading lists, and at least one squadron took copies of the book with them to Operation Desert Storm as "a reality check on tactics".

Biography

Early life
Born a fourth-generation Oregonian, descended from American pioneers, American Revolutionary War Patriots, Pilgrims (e.g. Priscilla Alden) and Pocahontas, Tillman was raised on the family wheat and cattle ranch.  His younger brothers include a breeder of exotic animals and a Rhodes Scholar. In high school he was an Eagle Scout, won two state titles as a rudimental drummer, and was a champion speaker and debater. Tillman was first published in 1964 at age 15 and graduated from the University of Oregon in 1971 with a bachelor's degree in journalism.

Like his father, a Navy trained pilot in World War II, Tillman developed an early passion for aviation and learned to fly at age 16. Over the next several years, he flew a variety of vintage and historic aircraft, including a pre-WW II Navy trainer and a restored dive-bomber. The latter became the subject of his first book, The Dauntless Dive Bomber of World War II, published in 1976. It established the format for many subsequent books, operational histories of U.S. Navy aircraft.

Marriage and children
Tillman lives in Mesa, Arizona with his wife, Sally.

Career
After college Tillman worked as a freelance writer until 1982 when he founded Champlin Fighter Museum Press in Mesa, Arizona, publishing out-of-print and new titles on military aviation.

In 1986, he moved to San Diego to become managing editor of The Hook, quarterly journal of the Tailhook Association. He remained in that position for three years before deciding to focus full-time to writing fiction. His first novel was published in June 1990. Warriors depicted a Mideast air war and became an immediate best seller when Iraq invaded Kuwait two months later.

Tillman's next two novels appeared in 1992: The Sixth Battle, (written with his brother John) which captured a wide following among computer war gamers; and Dauntless, intended as the first in a trilogy. It was followed by Hellcats, nominated as military novel of the year in 1996. He has also published original fiction in the Stephen Coonts anthologies, Combat and Victory.

Tillman remains active as a magazine writer. He is a regular contributor to The Hook, Aviation History, and several firearms publications. He has also reported from Africa for Soldier of Fortune magazine.

Tillman is a former executive secretary of the American Fighter Aces Association.

Works

Published works

Nonfiction
 Jimmy Doolittle: The First 80 Years (1976) 
 The Dauntless Dive-Bomber of World War II (1976) 
 Hellcat: the F6F in World War II (1979) 
 Corsair: the F4U in World War II and Korea (1979) 
 On Yankee Station: the Naval Air War Over Vietnam (1987) (with CDR John B. Nichols, USN (Ret)) 
 TBF-TBM Avenger at War (1979, re-released 1991) 
 MiG Master: Story of the F-8 Crusader (1980, second edition 1990) 
 Wildcat: the F4F in World War II (1983, second edition 1990) 
 Sun Downers: VF-11 in World War II (1993) 
 The Marianas Turkey Shoot, June 19–20, 1944: Carrier Battle in the Philippine Sea (Phalanx Pub. Co., 1994) 
 Pushing the Envelope: The Career of Test Pilot Marion Carl (1994) (with MajGen Marion E. Carl, USMC (Ret.)) Reissued in 2005 by  Naval Institute Press.   
 Wildcat Aces of World War II (1995) 
 Wildcats to Tomcats: The Tailhook Navy (1995) (with CAPTs W.M. Schirra, R.L. Cormier & P.R. Wood, USN (Ret.))
 Carrier Air War: World War II in Original Color (1996) (with Robert L. Lawson.) Reissued as World War II U.S. Navy Air Combat, (2002)
 Hellcat Aces of World War II (1996) 
 Warbird Tech: Vought F4U Corsair (1997) 
 U.S. Navy Fighter Squadrons of World War II (Specialty Press, 1997) 
 Helldiver Units of World War II (Osprey, 1997) 
 U.S. Navy Fighters of World War II (MBI Pub. Co., 1998) (with R.L. Lawson) 
 SBD Dauntless Units of World War II (Osprey, 1998)  
 TBF/TBM Avenger Units of World War 2 (Osprey, 1999) 
 TBD Devastator Units of the U. S. Navy (Osprey, 2000) 
 TBF Avenger Units of World War II (2000)
 The Complete Guide to AR-15 Accuracy (2000) (with Derrick Martin) 
 U.S. Navy Dive and Torpedo Bombers (MBI Pub. Co., 2001) (with R.L. Lawson) 
 Above & Beyond: The Aviation Medals of Honor (2002) 
 The Alpha Bravo Delta Guide to the U.S. Air Force (Alpha, 2003) 
 Brassey's D-Day Encyclopedia (2004); (Second edition, Regnery, 2014) 
 Clash of the Carriers: The True Story of the Marianas Turkey Shoot of World War II (2005) 
 Heroes: Army Recipients of the Medal of Honor (2006) 
 LeMay (2007) 
 What We Need: Extravagance and Shortages in America's Military (2007) 
 VF-11/111 'Sundowners' 1942-95 (Osprey, 2010) (with Henk van der Lugt) 
 Whirlwind: The Air War Against Japan 1942–1945 (2010) 
 Enterprise: America's Fightingest Ship and The Men Who Helped Win World War II (2012) 
 Forgotten Fifteenth: The Daring Airmen Who Crippled Hitler's War Machine (Regnery Publishing, Inc., 2014) 
 US Marine Corps Fighter Squadrons of World War II (Osprey, 2014) 
 On Wave and Wing: The 100 Year Quest to Perfect the Aircraft Carrier (Regnery History, 2017) 
 Dragon's Jaw: An Epic Story of Courage and Tenacity in Vietnam with Stephen Coonts. (Da Capo, 2019) 
 When the Shooting Stopped: August 1945 (Bloomsbury-Osprey, 2022) 
Chapters in non-fiction works:
 R.L. Lawson, ed. History of U.S. Naval Air Power (1985)
 .
 Saburō Sakai Samurai! (1991)
 Steve Coonts, ed. War in the Air (1996)
 Jack Sweetmen, ed. Great American Naval Battles (1998)
 Hill Goodspeed, ed. U.S. Naval Aviation (2001)
 Tom Clancy series, revised chapter Fighter Wing (2004)
 Walter Boyne, ed. Today's Best Military Writing (2004)

Introductions to:
 Another Country by Jeff Cooper (2005)
 Fire Works by Jeff Cooper (2005)
 To Ride, Shoot Straight & Speak the Truth by Jeff Cooper (2005)

Fiction
 Warriors (1990) (with CDR John B. Nichols, USN (Ret)) 
 The Sixth Battle (1992) (with John L. Tillman)  
 Dauntless: A Novel of Midway and Guadalcanal (Bantam Books, 1992) 
 Hellcats: A Novel of the Pacific War (Brassey's, 1996) 
 "Skyhawks Forever." Combat (2001) (Steve Coonts, ed., et al.)
 "I Relieve You, Sir." A Date Which Will Live in Infamy (2001) (Brian Thomsen and Martin Greenberg, eds., et al.)
 "Flame On Tarawa." Victory (2003) (Steve Coonts, ed., et al.)
 Pandora's Legion (2007) with Harold Coyle 
 Prometheus' Child (2007) with Harold Coyle 
 Vulcan's Fire (2008) with Harold Coyle

Awards
As of 2021 Tillman has received ten history and writing awards including the second Admiral Radford Award for Naval History and Literature and is an honorary member of three Navy squadrons. He has been honored by the Air Force Historical Foundation, the American Aviation Historical Society, and twice by the U.S. Naval Institute.  He received the Lifetime Achievement award from the Tailhook Association in 1998.

References

External links
 Barrett Tillman official website
 Barrett Tillman's page at Macmillan.com
 Online Interview
 

Living people
1948 births
20th-century American novelists
American people of English descent
21st-century American novelists
American male novelists
University of Oregon alumni
Novelists from Oregon
20th-century American male writers
21st-century American male writers